The Cullinan Diamond is the largest gem-quality rough diamond ever found, weighing , discovered at the Premier No.2 mine in Cullinan, South Africa, on 26 January 1905. It was named after Thomas Cullinan, the owner of the mine. In April 1905, it was put on sale in London, but despite considerable interest, it was still unsold after two years. In 1907, the Transvaal Colony government bought the Cullinan and Prime Minister Louis Botha presented it to Edward VII, the British king who reigned over the territory, and it was cut by Joseph Asscher & Co. in Amsterdam. 

Cullinan produced stones of various cuts and sizes, the largest of which is named Cullinan I or the Great Star of Africa, and at  it is the largest clear cut diamond in the world. The stone is mounted in the head of the Sovereign's Sceptre with Cross. The second-largest is Cullinan II or the Second Star of Africa, weighing , mounted in the Imperial State Crown. Both are part of the Crown Jewels of the United Kingdom. The Queen also owned minor brilliants and a set of unpolished fragments.

Discovery and early history 

The Cullinan is estimated to have formed in Earth's mantle transition zone at a depth of 410–660 km (255–410 miles) and reached the surface 1.18 billion years ago. Newspapers called it the "Cullinan Diamond", a reference to Sir Thomas Cullinan, who opened the mine in 1902. It was three times the size of the Excelsior Diamond, found in 1893 at Jagersfontein Mine, weighing . Four of its eight surfaces were smooth, indicating that it once had been part of a much larger stone broken up by natural forces. It had a blue-white hue and contained a small pocket of air, which at certain angles produced a rainbow, or Newton's rings.

Shortly after its discovery, Cullinan went on public display at the Standard Bank in Johannesburg, where it was seen by an estimated 8,000–9,000 visitors. In April 1905, the rough gem was deposited with Premier Mining Co.'s London sales agent, S. Neumann & Co. Due to its immense value, detectives were assigned to a steamboat that was rumoured to be carrying the stone, and a parcel was ceremoniously locked in the captain's safe and guarded on the entire journey. It was a diversionary tactic – the stone on that ship was fake, meant to attract those who would be interested in stealing it. Cullinan was sent to the United Kingdom in a plain box via registered post. On arriving in London, it was conveyed to Buckingham Palace for inspection by King Edward VII. Although it drew considerable interest from potential buyers, Cullinan went unsold for two years.

Presentation to Edward VII
Transvaal Prime Minister, Louis Botha, suggested buying the diamond for Edward VII as "a token of the loyalty and attachment of the people of the Transvaal to His Majesty's throne and person". In August 1907, a vote was held in the Legislative Council on the Cullinan's fate, and a motion authorising the purchase was carried by 42 votes in favour to 19 against. Initially, Henry Campbell-Bannerman, then British Prime Minister, advised the king to decline the offer, but he later decided to let Edward VII choose whether or not to accept the gift. Eventually, he was persuaded by Winston Churchill, then Colonial Under-Secretary. For his trouble, Churchill was sent a replica, which he enjoyed showing off to guests on a silver plate. Due to a 60% tax on mining profits, the Treasury received some of its money back from the Premier Diamond Mining Company.

The diamond was presented to the king at Sandringham House by Agent-General of the colony, Sir Richard Solomon, on 9 November 1907 – his sixty-sixth birthday – in the presence of a large party of guests, including the Queen of Sweden, the Queen of Spain, the Duke of Westminster and Lord Revelstoke. The king asked his colonial secretary, Lord Elgin, to announce that he accepted the gift "for myself and my successors" and that he would ensure "this great and unique diamond be kept and preserved among the historic jewels which form the heirlooms of the Crown".

Cutting process

The king chose Joseph Asscher & Co. of Amsterdam to cleave and polish the rough stone into brilliant gems of various cuts and sizes. Abraham Asscher collected it from the Colonial Office in London on 23 January 1908. He returned to the Netherlands by train and ferry with the diamond in his coat pocket. Meanwhile, to much fanfare, a Royal Navy ship carried an empty box across the North Sea, again throwing off potential thieves. Even the captain was unaware that his "precious" cargo was a decoy.

On 10 February 1908, the rough stone was split in half by Joseph Asscher at his diamond-cutting factory in Amsterdam. At the time, technology had not yet evolved to guarantee the quality of modern standards, and cutting the diamond was difficult and risky. Making the incision alone took four days, and a steel knife broke on the first attempt, but a second knife was fitted into the groove and split the stone cleanly in two along one of four possible cleavage planes. In all, splitting and cutting the diamond took eight months, with three people working 14 hours per day to complete the task.

"The tale is told of Joseph Asscher, the greatest cleaver of the day," wrote Matthew Hart in his book Diamond: A Journey to the Heart of an Obsession (2002), "that when he prepared to cleave the largest diamond ever known … he had a doctor and nurse standing by and when he finally struck the diamond … he fainted dead away". Lord Ian Balfour, in his book Famous Diamonds (2009), dispels the fainting story, suggesting it was more likely Joseph would have celebrated, opening a bottle of champagne. When Joseph's nephew Louis heard the story, he exclaimed "No Asscher would ever faint over any operation on any diamond".

Diamonds cut from the Cullinan
All but the two largest stones – Cullinans I and II – remained in Amsterdam by arrangement as the fee for Asscher's services, until the South African government bought them (except Cullinan VI, which Edward VII had purchased and given to his wife Queen Alexandra in 1907), and the High Commissioner for Southern Africa presented them to Queen Mary on 28 June 1910. Mary also inherited Cullinan VI from Alexandra, and she left all her Cullinan diamonds to her granddaughter Elizabeth II in 1953. Cullinans I and II are part of the Crown Jewels, which belong to the King in right of the Crown.

Asscher sold the minor stones to the South African government, which distributed them to Queen Mary; Louis Botha, then prime minister of South Africa; the diamond merchants Arthur and Alexander Levy, who supervised the cutting of Cullinan; and Jacob Romijn (later Romyn), who co-founded the first trade union in the diamond industry. Some were set by Mary into a long platinum chain, which Elizabeth never wore in public, saying that "it gets in the soup". In the 1960s, two minor Cullinan diamonds owned by Louis Botha's heirs were analysed at the De Beers laboratory in Johannesburg and found to be completely free of nitrogen or any other impurities. Cullinans I and II were examined in the 1980s by gemologists at the Tower of London and both graded as colourless type IIa.

Cullinan I

Cullinan I, or the Great Star of Africa, is a pendeloque-cut brilliant weighing  and has 74 facets. It is set at the top of the Sovereign's Sceptre with Cross which had to be redesigned in 1910 to accommodate it. Cullinan I was surpassed as the world's largest cut diamond of any colour by the  brown Golden Jubilee Diamond in 1992, but is still the largest clear cut diamond in the world. In terms of clarity, it has a few tiny cleavages and a small patch of graining. The  diamond is fitted with loops and can be taken out of its setting to be worn as a pendant suspended from Cullinan II to make a brooch. Queen Mary, wife of George V, often wore it like this. In 1908, the stone was valued at US$2.5 million (equivalent to US$ million in )– two and a half times the rough Cullinan's estimated value.

Cullinan II
Cullinan II, or the Second Star of Africa, is a cushion-cut brilliant with 66 facets weighing  set in the front of the Imperial State Crown, below the Black Prince's Ruby (a large spinel). It measures . The diamond has a number of tiny flaws, scratches on the table facet, and a small chip at the girdle. Like Cullinan I, it is held in place by a yellow gold enclosure, which is screwed onto the crown.

Cullinan III
Cullinan III, or the Lesser Star of Africa, is pear-cut and weighs . In 1911, Queen Mary, wife and queen consort of George V, had it set in the top cross pattée of a crown that she personally bought for her coronation. In 1912, the Delhi Durbar Tiara, worn the previous year by Mary instead of a crown at the Delhi Durbar, where her husband wore the Imperial Crown of India, was also adapted to take Cullinans III and IV. In 1914, Cullinan III was permanently replaced on the crown by a crystal model. Elizabeth II frequently wore Cullinan III in combination with Cullinan IV as a brooch. Cullinan III has also been used as a pendant on the Coronation Necklace, where it occasionally replaced the  Lahore Diamond.

Cullinan IV

Cullinan IV, also referred to as a Lesser Star of Africa, is square-cut and weighs . It was also set in the base of Queen Mary's Crown but was removed in 1914. On 25 March 1958, while she and Prince Philip were on a state visit to the Netherlands, Queen Elizabeth II revealed that Cullinan III and IV are known in her family as "Granny's Chips". They visited the Asscher Diamond Company, where Cullinan had been cut 50 years earlier. It was the first time the Queen had worn the brooch publicly. During her visit, she unpinned the brooch and offered it for examination to Louis Asscher, nephew of Joseph Asscher, who split the rough diamond. Aged 84, he was deeply moved that the Queen had brought the diamonds with her, knowing how much it would mean to him seeing them again after so many years.

Cullinan V
Cullinan V is an  heart-shaped diamond set in the centre of a platinum brooch that formed a part of the stomacher made for Queen Mary to wear at the Delhi Durbar in 1911. The brooch was designed to show off Cullinan V and is pavé-set with a border of smaller diamonds. It can be suspended from the VIII brooch and can be used to suspend the VII pendant. It was often worn like this by Mary.

Cullinan VI
Cullinan VI is marquise-cut and weighs . It hangs from the brooch containing Cullinan VIII and forming part of the stomacher of the Delhi Durbar parure. Cullinan VI along with VIII can also be fitted together to make yet another brooch, surrounded by some 96 smaller diamonds. The design was created around the same time that the Cullinan V heart-shaped brooch was designed, both having a similar shape.

Cullinan VII
Cullinan VII is also marquise-cut and weighs . It was originally given by Edward VII to his wife and consort Queen Alexandra. After his death she gave the jewel to Queen Mary, who had it set as a pendant hanging from the diamond-and-emerald Delhi Durbar necklace, part of the parure.

Cullinan VIII
Cullinan VIII is an oblong-cut diamond weighing . It is set in the centre of a brooch forming part of the stomacher of the Delhi Durbar parure. Together with Cullinan VI it forms a brooch.

Cullinan IX
Cullinan IX is smallest of the principal diamonds to be obtained from the rough Cullinan. It is a pendeloque or stepped pear-cut stone, weighs , and is set in a platinum ring known as the Cullinan IX Ring.

See also 

 List of diamonds
 List of largest rough diamonds
 Elizabeth II's jewels

Citations

General and cited references

Further reading

External links

 The Cullinan Diamond at the Royal Collection Trust (archived)
 Famous Diamonds at Cape Town Diamond Museum

1905 in South Africa
Crown Jewels of the United Kingdom
Diamonds originating in South Africa
History of Pretoria
Individual diamonds
Transvaal